Natalie Damjanovich-Napoleon (born 3 August 1972), known professionally as Natalie D-Napoleon, is an Australian/American singer-songwriter, poet, and writer of creative non-fiction from Fremantle, Western Australia. Through fronting the Perth-based ensemble Flavour of the Month, she was a forerunner in the emergence of alternative country music within Australia and was the winner of the 2018 Bruce Dawe National Poetry Prize.

Music
Natalie D-Napoleon's emergence upon the Western Australian music scene came via fronting the alternative pop band Bloom. In 1997 Bloom won the Western Australian Music Industry Award for Most Promising New Act.

Following the demise of Bloom, D-Napoleon, along with Month of Sunday's guitarist Grant Ferstat, formed an alternative country ensemble Flavour of the Month. The band's name was taken from the title of a song by The Posies from their album Frosting on the Beater. Flavour of the Month subsequently supported Ken Stringfellow of The Posies on one of his first solo tours of Australia. The band toured nationally in Australia as well undertaking tours of the United States and Europe.

During this period D-Napoleon also contributed backing vocals to several independent recordings including Road to Rome by DM3, which was one of the first solo albums by Dom Mariani after the hibernation of The Stems, and former Stonemason's frontman, Joe Algeri's, solo debut Everything Under The Sun, along with singing with alternative-country band, The Jayco Brothers, on their release Asbestos Fibro.

After the demise of Flavour in the Month in 2005, D-Napoleon started performing solo and in November 2007 released her debut solo recording, a five-track EP titled "After The Flood".

In 2009, D-Napoleon undertook two further solo recording. In April 2009 she collaborated with Santa Barbara-based musician and producer Jesse Rhodes on a six-track EP of cover versions. Titled Here in California the release features three songs from Australian composers and three songs from Americans. The recording features the collective talents of D-Napoleon, Rhodes, Kenny Edwards, Dan Phillips, Phil Parlapiano, and Sally Barr.

In May 2009, D-Napoleon started work on her debut solo album. Partly funded by a Western Australia Department of Culture and the Arts Music Production Grant, the album was recorded at Sound Design Studios in Santa Barbara and produced by David Piltch. The recording features the collective talents of Kenny Edwards, Dan Phillips, Aaron Sterling, Greg Leisz, Victoria Williams, Phil Parlapiano, Jesse Rhodes, and Melanie Robinson.

Prior to returning permanently to Australia in 2019, D-Napoleon recorded a new album of material titled You Wanted To Be The Shore But Instead You Were The Sea. Produced by James Connolly and featuring Dan Phillips and Doug Pettibone, the album was recorded with a single microphone in a historic chapel nestled in the hills behind Santa Barbara. You Wanted To Be The Shore But Instead You Were The Sea was released in Australia on October 1, 2020 and debuted on the Australian Independent Record Labels Association (AIR) 100% Independent Chart at No. 5 for the week beginning October 6 and reached No. 1 on November 16.

In the live arena, D-Napoleon has performed in a number of different solo configurations. She formed a Santa Barbara-based trio with Dan Phillips on piano and percussion and Kenny Edwards on electric guitar and mandolin in 2007, pairing back to duo with Phillips after Edwards' passing in 2010. In 2014 D-Napoleon expanded the ensemble to a four-piece with the addition of James Connolly on bass and David Cowan on guitar with Doug Pettibone taking over on electric guitar and mandolin in 2019. In Australia D-Napoleon originally performed as a trio with Richard Lane on guitar and Cathi Olivieri on viola and recruited established bands, such as The Justin Walshe Folk Machine, to back her on tour. Since returning to Australia in 2019 D-Napoleon has performed as a trio with Olivieri on viola and piano and Michael Lane on banjo and mandolin, a quartet with the addition on Ben Franz on upright bass and pedal steel, and a full band with Dave Brewer on electric guitar and Andy Pearson on drums and percussion.

Writing and poetry
Having had poetry and creative non-fiction work published in journals such as Westerly, Meanjin, Southerly, and Australian Poetry Journal, D-Napoleon was a finalist for the Penelope Niven Creative Nonfiction Award in the 2018 and 2017 International Literary Awards through the Salem College Center for Women Writers.

In 2018 D-Napoleon was awarded the Bruce Dawe National Poetry Prize for her poem "First Blood: A Sestina" and in 2019 her most recent book, First Blood, was released through Ginninderra Press. The book includes a collection of poems-as-memoir that challenge the preconceptions of girlhood. In her review of the book for Westerly Magazine, Amy Lim said, "D-Napoleon tugs at these constructs with a gentle irony—never bitter, but approximating criticism with a grace that only poetry can achieve."

In 2019 D-Napoleon was the International Guest Poet at the 2019 Perth Poetry Festival and won the 2019 Katharine Susannah Prichard Poetry Award for her poem, "If There is a Butterfly That Drinks Tears."

Personal life

Resides in Santa Barbara, California and Fremantle, Western Australia.

Discography

Albums
Leaving Me Dry (2012)
You Wanted To Be The Shore But Instead You Were The Sea (2020)

EPs
After The Flood (2007)
Here in California (2009)

Singles
Thunder Rumor (2020)
Wildflowers (2021)
You Wanted To Be The Shore But Instead You Were The Sea (2021)
Gasoline & Liquor (2021)
Mother of Exiles (2021)

As Bloom
The Cable Thing (1997)

As Flavour of the Month
Fear of Falling (2000)

Compilations
Kiss My WAMI, "Daisygrinding", WAM (2001)
Zipped Up and Down Under, "Daisygrinding", Zip Records (2001)
Pop On Top, "Sweetness Melting", Zip Records, (2002)
Dead Fox Compilation, "Slow Burn", Hooked Up Records (2008)
HomeGrown Roots 3, "Slow Burn", Foghorn Records (2008)
HomeGrown Roots 4, "To Her Door", Foghorn Records (2008)
Sounds Like Cafe, "To Her Door", Foghorn Records (2009)
Under the Covers, "You Shook Me All Night Long", ABC Music (2011)

Other recorded appearances
 Everything Under the Sun by Joe Algeri (1994)
Road to Rome by DM3 (1996)
Asbestos Fibro by The Jayco Brothers (2007)

References

External links
Natalie D-Napoleon Official Website
Interview from X-Press Magazine
Review from FasterLouder
Interview from Ventura County Star

1972 births
Living people
Australian women singer-songwriters
Australian folk singers
Folk artists
People from Fremantle
21st-century Australian singers
21st-century Australian women singers
Australian people of Croatian descent